Jonathan Michael Goldstein (born September 2, 1968) is an American screenwriter, television writer/producer, and film director. He has written for numerous situation comedies, including The PJ's starring Eddie Murphy, The Geena Davis Show, Good Morning Miami, Four Kings, and The New Adventures of Old Christine.

He is known in cinema for his collaborative work with John Francis Daley as a film-making duo, whom he met on The Geena Davis Show. The pair have worked on various projects together. Daley and Goldstein's earlier work was predominantly based in the comedy genre where they were co-screenwriters for Horrible Bosses (2011), co-writers for The Incredible Burt Wonderstone (2013), co-story writers for Horrible Bosses 2 (2014), and also co-wrote/co-directed the fifth film in the National Lampoon's Vacation film series, Vacation (2015). The duo received co-writer credits for Spider-Man: Homecoming (2017) with other screenwriters, which was met with critical and financial success; and they co-directed the 2018 black comedy Game Night, which also met with critical and financial success.

Personal life
Born in New York City, Goldstein moved to Beachwood, Ohio, in 1980, where he graduated from Beachwood High School in 1986. He attended the University of Michigan and then Harvard Law School, graduating in 1995. He worked for two years as a corporate litigator at the New York office of Jones, Day, Reavis & Pogue. Goldstein lives in Los Angeles with his wife, novelist Adena Halpern who he married in 2007.

Career
Finding the legal profession less than fulfilling, he moved to Los Angeles in 1998 to pursue a career in comedy writing. Shortly thereafter, he began writing for network television comedies and eventually films.

In 2007, in collaboration with his writing partner, John Francis Daley, Goldstein sold his first film script, The $40,000 Man, to New Line Cinema. Since that first sale, Goldstein and Daley have been engaged on a number of other feature projects, including Hours of Fun, The Incredible Burt Wonderstone, starring Steve Carell and Jim Carrey, Cal of the Wild for Steven Spielberg and DreamWorks, and an adaptation of the documentary Of All the Things for Warner Brothers, also with Steve Carell set to play the lead. New Line's Horrible Bosses was released on July 8, 2011 and has made over $200 million in worldwide box office. In 2009, the team were hired to rewrite the sequel to the animated film, Cloudy with a Chance of Meatballs.

Goldstein and Daley co-wrote and directed their script for Vacation, a follow-up to the 1983 comedy film National Lampoon's Vacation. Ed Helms played the adult Rusty Griswold. The film grossed $104 million in worldwide box office off a budget of $32 million.

Goldstein and Daley wrote the screenplay for the 2017 film Spider-Man: Homecoming, and were both considered to direct before Jon Watts was hired.

Goldstein and Daley directed the 2018 black comedy Game Night, based on a screenplay by Mark Perez. The film, starring Jason Bateman and Rachel McAdams, "earned a raft of glowing reviews for its whip-smart script, energetic performances, and deliberate avoidance of modern comedy's ubiquitous tropes," and grossed $117 million at the worldwide box office, versus a $37 million budget. While they did not receive screenwriter credit, they later said they rewrote "almost all of the original script's dialogue, totally overhauled the characters — most notably a creepy cop portrayed by Jesse Plemons — and comprehensively reworked the original script's third act."

In 2018, it was announced that the filmmaking duo would direct a film adaptation of DC Comics' The Flash for the DC Extended Universe, but it was announced in July that they have left the project. Despite this, both Goldstein and Daley received story by credit alongside the film's screenwriter, Christina Hodson.

In 2019, it was announced that Goldstein and Daley were in talks be directing the reboot of Dungeons & Dragons: Honor Among Thieves (2023). In January 2020, it was announced that, in addition to directing, they would be writing a new draft of the screenplay.

Filmography
Short films

Feature films

Television

References

External links

American male screenwriters
Comedy film directors
Harvard Law School alumni
Living people
1968 births
University of Michigan alumni
Writers from New York City
New York (state) lawyers
Screenwriters from New York (state)
Sony Pictures Animation people